Handedness is a human attribute reflecting the unequal distribution of fine motor skill between the left and right hands.

Handedness may also refer to:

 Chirality, Greek for handedness, used to describe similar concepts in other fields:
 Chirality (chemistry), a property of molecules having a non-superimposable mirror image
 Chirality (electromagnetism), an electromagnetic propagation in chiral media
 Chirality (mathematics), the property of a figure not being identical to its mirror image
 Chirality (physics), when a phenomenon is not identical to its mirror image
 Sinistral and dextral, terms in biology and geology
 Orientation (vector space), an asymmetry that makes a reflection impossible to replicate by means of a simple rotation
 Handedness of a helix, a spiral structure
 Handedness of screw threads, springs, or propellers, in mechanics and engineering